Balabin (Russian: Балабин) is a Russian masculine surname, its feminine counterpart is Balabina. The name originates from the Russian word balaba meaning round bread and implying a short, chubby person. It may refer to:
 Eugene Balabin (1815–1895), Russian Roman Catholic priest
 Viktor Balabin (1811–1864), Russian diplomat and ambassador

See also 
 Alabina
 Balbina (disambiguation)

References 

Russian-language surnames